The following is a list of the 890 communes of the Pas-de-Calais department of France. It is the department in France with the most communes rather than any departments, and covers 91 per cent of its land area of the department.

The communes cooperate in the following intercommunalities (as of 2020):
Communauté urbaine d'Arras
Communauté d'agglomération de Béthune-Bruay, Artois-Lys Romane
Communauté d'agglomération du Boulonnais
CA Grand Calais Terres et Mers
Communauté d'agglomération des Deux Baies en Montreuillois
Communauté d'agglomération d'Hénin-Carvin
Communauté d'agglomération de Lens – Liévin
Communauté d'agglomération du Pays de Saint-Omer
Communauté de communes des 7 Vallées
Communauté de communes des Campagnes de l'Artois
Communauté de communes de Desvres-Samer
Communauté de communes Flandre Lys (partly)
Communauté de communes du Haut Pays du Montreuillois
Communauté de communes Osartis Marquion
Communauté de communes du Pays de Lumbres
Communauté de communes des Pays d'Opale
Communauté de communes de la Région d'Audruicq
Communauté de communes du Sud-Artois
Communauté de communes du Ternois (partly)
Communauté de communes de la Terre des Deux Caps

References

Pas-de-Calais